is a Japanese football player for Oita Trinita.

His younger brother Kento is also a professional footballer currently playing for Kashima Antlers.

Club statistics
Updated to 1 August 2022.

1Includes Japanese Super Cup.

Achievements
Shonan Bellmare
J2 League (1): 2014
Kashima Antlers
Japanese Super Cup (1): 2017
AFC Champions League (1): 2018

References

External links
 
 
 

1991 births
Living people
Waseda University alumni
Association football people from Tokyo Metropolis
Japanese footballers
J1 League players
J2 League players
Shonan Bellmare players
Kashima Antlers players
Oita Trinita players
Association football defenders
People from Musashino, Tokyo